John Bruce is an interior designer best known for his many appearances on the Learning Channel home renovation TV series While You Were Out. Bruce appeared in the first season and stayed with the show until the very end - he was the featured designer in the final episode. He was known for bringing an arty sensibility to people's homes - creating furniture based on an exquisite corpse design, for instance. While his designs were often much more avant garde than the homeowners would normally be comfortable with, at the end of the show they were almost always pleased with the results.

Bruce has also worked behind the scenes on various films, include the award-winning indie I Shot Andy Warhol.

Bruce was given a "special thanks" credit in the film version of Hedwig and the Angry Inch. In a chat on the fan website whileyouwereonline.com, Bruce explained that this was because he was friends with John Cameron Mitchell and offered feedback on the original theatrical script.

John can now be seen as part of the "Green Team" on the syndicated television series The EcoZone Project, which features eco-friendly makeovers for celebrities' homes.

References

External links
 www.super-interesting.com

Living people
American interior designers
Year of birth missing (living people)